Vágner Kaetano Pereira, also known as Pula (Russian Cyrillic: Пула; born 2 December 1980), is a Brazilian-born Russian futsal player who plays for Magnus Sorocaba Futsal as a pivot.

Career
He played for Russia at the 2008 FIFA Futsal World Cup in his homeland, Brazil, and ended the tournament as top scorer with 18 goals, the first on 2 October in a 10–5 win over Cuba. Nine of them came in a 31–2 group win over the Solomon Islands, the most by a player in the World Cup and biggest win by a team. He then scored the sixth in a 9–1 win over Japan. In the second match of the second group phase, he scored a hat-trick as Russia beat Paraguay 5–4. Pula scored a goal against Brazil but lost 4–2.

References

External links
 Pula at uefa.com

1980 births
Living people
Brazilian men's futsal players
Russian men's futsal players
Brazilian emigrants to Russia
Naturalised citizens of Russia
MFK Dinamo Moskva players
Sportspeople from São Paulo